Alan M. Olson is a Professor of the Philosophy of Religion, Emeritus, at Boston University. He received his degrees from Saint Olaf College (BA, History and Philosophy), Luther Theological Seminary (M.Div., Theology), Nashotah House, where he studied with Arthur Anton Vogel, and Boston University (Ph.D.) where he studied with Peter A. Bertocci, Erazim Kohak, Harold H. Oliver and John N. Findlay. He served as Chairman of the Religion Department at Boston University, 1980–1987, and Chairman of the Philosophy Department, ad interim, 1987-1989. During the 1970s he was Program Coordinator of the Boston University Institute for Philosophy and Religion; and was Executive Director of the Twentieth World Congress of Philosophy in Boston, 1998.  He was a Senior Fulbright Research Fellow at University of Tübingen, Germany, in 1986, where he studied with Klaus Hartmann; and a Senior Fulbright Research Fellow and visiting fellow at the Institut für die Wissenschaften vom Menschen, Vienna, Austria, in 1995, where he worked with Krzysztof Michalski. He served on the Board of Officers of the American Philosophical Association, 2000–2003; and is past president of the Karl Jaspers Society of North America. He delivered the Jaspers Lectures at university college, Oxford in 1989; and was co-editor, with Helmut Wautischer, of the philosophical journal, Existenz from 2006 to 2015. He lives on Cape Cod with his wife, Janet L. Olson, Professor Emerita, College of Fine Arts, Boston University. They have two daughters, Maren Kirsten, Sonja Astrid, and one grandson, Søren.

Books and Edited Works
Transcendence and Hermeneutics -   
The Seeing Eye, Co-Author - 
Hegel and the Spirit -  
Disguises of the Demonic, Ed. - 
Myth, Symbol, and Reality, Ed. -  
Transcendence and the Sacred, Co-Ed. - 
Heidegger and Jaspers, Ed. -  
Video Icons & Values, Co-Ed. -  
Educating for Democracy, Co-Ed. - 
Proceedings of the Twentieth World Congress of Philosophy, 12 Vols., Exec. Ed. - 
''Philosophical Faith and the Future of Humanity, Co-Ed, -

References

External links 
 Alan M. Olson's homepage
 Boston University Faculty
 The Paideia Project
 American Philosophical Association
 Karl Jaspers Society of North America
 Existenz
 Gladys Leandra Portuondo Blogspot

1939 births
Living people
St. Olaf College alumni
Nashotah House alumni
Philosophers from Minnesota
Philosophers from Massachusetts
American philosophy academics
Boston University faculty
Philosophers of religion
Continental philosophers
Writers from Minnesota